Chino cloth is a twill fabric, originally made of 100% cotton. The most common items made from it, trousers, are widely called chinos. Today it is also found in cotton-synthetic blends.

Developed in the mid-19th century for British and French military uniforms, it has since migrated into civilian wear. Trousers of such a fabric gained popularity in the U.S. when Spanish–American War veterans returned from the Philippines with their twill military trousers.

Etymology
As the cloth itself was originally made in China, the trousers were known in Spanish as pantalones chinos (Chinese pants), which became shortened to simply "chinos" in English.

History
First designed to be used in the military, chino fabric was originally made to be simple, durable and comfortable for soldiers to wear; the use of natural earth-tone colors also began the move towards camouflage, instead of the brightly colored tunics used prior. The British and United States armies started wearing it as standard during the latter half of the 1800s.

The pure-cotton fabric is widely used for trousers, referred to as chinos. The original khaki (light brown) is the traditional and most popular color, but chinos are made in many shades.

References

Further reading
 
 
 

Woven fabrics
Trousers and shorts